Neolepisorus is a genus of ferns in the family Polypodiaceae, subfamily Microsoroideae, according to the Pteridophyte Phylogeny Group classification of 2016 (PPG I).

Taxonomy
Neolepisorus was first described by Ren-Chang Ching in 1940. A molecular phylogenetic study in 2019 suggested that Neolepisorus was one of a group of closely related genera in the subfamily Microsoroideae, a group the authors termed "Lepisorus sensu lato". It species were embedded in a clade in which none of the genera appeared to be monophyletic:

Species
, the Checklist of Ferns and Lycophytes of the World recognized the following species:
Neolepisorus fortunei (T.Moore) Li Wang
Neolepisorus pappei (Mett. ex Kuhn) Li Wang
Neolepisorus zippelii (Blume) Li Wang

, Plants of the World Online did not accept the genus, sinking it into Neocheiropteris, although placing some of its species in Microsorum.

References

Polypodiaceae
Fern genera